László Balogh may refer to:

 László Balogh (rower) (born 1951), Hungarian Olympic rower
 László Balogh (painter) (born 1930), Hungarian painter
 László Balogh (sport shooter) (1958–2019), Hungarian sport shooter